Ernst Killander (10 March 1882 – 24 January 1958), a Swedish Major in the First World War, was one of the people who made the sport of orienteering popular in Scandinavian countries.

Killander was a vegetarian. He was President of the Swedish Vegetarian Society and attended the International Vegetarian Union Congress in 1953.

See also
History of orienteering

References

1882 births
1958 deaths
Swedish Army officers
Swedish orienteers
Male orienteers
Orienteering innovators
Orienteering in Sweden
Vegetarianism activists